Garbuglia is a surname. Notable people with the surname include:

Enrico Garbuglia (1900–2007), Italian World War I veteran
Mario Garbuglia (1927–2010), Italian set designer

Italian-language surnames